The World Association for Christian Communication (WACC) is an international NGO registered as a charity in Canada and the United Kingdom.

WACC has members in 120 countries. Members are organised into eight Regional Associations (Africa, Asia, Caribbean, Europe, Latin America, Middle East, North America and Pacific).

History 

The origins of WACC date back to 1950 when Christian communicators from Europe and North America began seeking guidelines for the future of religious broadcasting. Several organisations, including the World Council of Churches, shared the same concerns and they eventually joined forces to establish the 'old' WACC in 1968. Rapid developments in mass media worldwide and a concern to integrate the work of the Agency for Christian Literature Development of the World Council of Churches led to a merger in 1975 that created the present WACC. In 1986 WACC adopted its Christian Principles of Communication as a statement of core values based on  Liberation Theology's option for the poor.

WACC's Theory of  Change articulates how a focus on communication—as a right, as a practice, as a skill and as a profession—is fundamental to achieving dignity, inclusion, and informed and active participation, essential to sustainable development and just and peaceful communities.

Activities 

WACC's wide-ranging activities include support for communication projects mainly, but not exclusively, in the global south; the promotion of analysis, reflection and action on important topics related to its areas of concern; support for networking within and beyond its membership; and publication and sharing of information. WACC's project support has traditionally been largely of a responsive nature. WACC's largest single activity is The Global Media Monitoring Project (GMMP) a worldwide longitudinal study (1995, 2000, 2005) on the representation of women in the world's media. The fifth research in the series was conducted in 2015 by hundreds of volunteers in 114 countries around the world. The next GMMP is scheduled for 2020.

WACC, which celebrated its 50th anniversary in 2018, WACC has been instrumental in developing the concept of Communication Rights and their relationship to participatory development communication.

External links 
 WACC Global home page
 Who Makes the News - The home of the Global Media Monitoring Project (GMMP)
 Centre for Communication Rights
 WACC Talks - Short video clips on key themes related to communication rights

International Christian organizations
Charities based in Canada